Brenan is a surname and a given name. Notable people with the name include:

Surname
 Gerald Brenan (1894 – 1987), British writer and Hispanist
 James Brenan (1837 – 1907), Irish artist
 Ryan Brenan (1798 – 1868), Australian politician from New South Wales
 John Brenan (physician) (1768?- 1830), Irish physician
 John Patrick Micklethwait Brenan (1917 – 1985), British botanist
 Joseph Brenan (1828 – 1857), Irish writer and nationalist
 Michael John Brenan (1780 – 1847), Irish Roman Catholic priest and historian

Given name
 Brenan (author) (fl. 1756)
 Brenan Espartinez, Filipino singer
 Brenan Cruse, American singer

See also
 Brennan (given name)
 Brennan (surname)